Pagano is a station on Line 1 of the Milan Metro in Milan, Italy. The underground station was opened on 1 November 1964 as part of the inaugural section of the Metro, between Sesto Marelli and Lotto. On 2 April 1966, a section from Pagano to Gambara was added. It is located on Via Mario Pagano. The line branches here; trains continue toward either Bisceglie or  Rho Fiera.

References

Line 1 (Milan Metro) stations
Railway stations opened in 1964